Yuri Nikolayevich Vostrukhin (born 12 May 1964) is a former Russian professional football player.

Club career
He made his Russian Football National League debut for FC Torpedo Taganrog on 3 April 1993 in a game against FC Kuban Krasnodar.

Honours
 Russian Second Division Zone 2 top scorer: 1992 (46 goals).

External links
 

1964 births
Living people
Soviet footballers
Russian footballers
FC Akhmat Grozny players
FC Tobol Kurgan players
PFC Spartak Nalchik players
FC SKA Rostov-on-Don players
FC Volgar Astrakhan players
FC Nika Krasny Sulin players
FC Taganrog players
Association football forwards